Susanne Zenor (born November 26, 1947) is an American actress best known for the role of Margo Anderman Horton on Days of Our Lives.

Zenor's career began in 1970 with the movie The Moonshine War (1970) in which she portrayed Miley Mitchell. Zenor appeared in the Woody Allen movie Play It Again, Sam (1972) in which her name was listed as Suzanne Zenor. She played Alda Wadsworth  in The Baby (1973) and was credited as Suzanne Zenor. She also appeared as one of Stockard Channing's victims on TV in Joan Rivers' dark comedy The Girl Most Likely to... (1973), which co-starred Edward Asner.

Zenor made many television guest appearances during the 1970s,  in shows such as McMillan & Wife, Love, American Style, M*A*S*H, The Six Million Dollar Man, and Barnaby Jones. In 1976, she appeared in ABC's original pilot to Three's Company playing the naive blonde, Samantha. She starred alongside John Ritter and Valerie Curtin. A second pilot followed, with Susan Lanier in the role of Samantha, now called Chrissy. Eventually, the role went to Suzanne Somers.

In 1977, Zenor started playing the role of Margo Anderman Horton on the soap opera Days of Our Lives. Zenor left the role in 1980. She was married to her Days co-star Edward Mallory until his death in 2007.

References

External links
 

1947 births
20th-century American actresses
Actresses from Louisville, Kentucky
American film actresses
American soap opera actresses
American television actresses
Living people
21st-century American women